James Bernard Fisher (23 February 1934 – 7 April 2022) was an English professional footballer who played as a goalkeeper in the Football League for Hull City and Bradford City.

He died in April 2022, aged 88.

References

1934 births
2022 deaths
English footballers
Footballers from York
Association football goalkeepers
English Football League players
Hull City A.F.C. players
Bradford City A.F.C. players